The 1969 Central Michigan Chippewas football team represented Central Michigan University in the Interstate Intercollegiate Athletic Conference (IIAC) during the 1969 NCAA College Division football season. In their third season under head coach Roy Kramer, the Chippewas compiled a 7–3 record (2–1 against IIAC opponents) and outscored their opponents, 254 to 147. The team's statistical leaders included quarterback Bob Miles with 305 passing yards, tailback Jesse Lakes with 1,263 rushing yards, and Dave Lemere with 239 receiving yards. On September 27, 1969, Lakes set a school record, rushing for 343 yards (and also scored five touchdowns) in a 41-6 victory over Wisconsin-Milwaukee. Lakes broke Jim Podoley's record of 254 yards set in 1954. Lakes' record was broken in 1994 by Brian Pruitt. Tight end Dave Farris received the team's most valuable player award. Nine Central Michigan players (Lakes, Farris, defensive tackle Ralph Burde, guard Fred Ferguson, linebackers Tom Hahnenberg and Bump Lardie, defensive back Bob Markey, and tackles Mike Post and Jim Prisk) received first-team honors on the All-IIAC team.

Schedule

References

Central Michigan
Central Michigan Chippewas football seasons
Central Michigan Chippewas football